The latency stage is the fourth stage of Sigmund Freud's model of a child's psychosexual development. Freud believed that the child discharges their libido (sexual energy) through a distinct body area that characterizes each stage.

The stages are:
the 'oral phase' (first stage)
the 'anal phase' (second stage)
the 'phallic phase' (third stage)
the 'latency phase' (fourth stage)
the 'genital phase' (fifth stage).

In general
The latency stage may begin around the age of 7 (the end of early childhood) and may continue until puberty, which happens around the age of 13. The age range is affected by childrearing practices; mothers in developed countries, during the time when Freud was forming his theories, were more likely to stay at home with young children, and adolescents began puberty on average later than adolescents today.

Freud described the latency phase as one of relative stability. No new organization of sexuality develops, and he did not pay a lot of attention to it. For this reason, this phase is not always mentioned in descriptions of his theory as one of the phases, but as a separate period.

The latency phase originates during the phallic stage when the child's Oedipus complex begins to dissolve. The child realizes that their wishes and longings for the parent of the opposite sex cannot be fulfilled and will turn away from these desires.

They start to identify with parent of the same sex. The libido is transferred from parents to friends of the same sex, clubs, and hero/role-model figures. The sexual and aggressive drives are expressed in socially accepted forms through the defense mechanisms of repression and sublimation.

During the latency phase, the energy the child previously put into the Oedipal problem can be used for developing the self. The superego is already present, but becomes more organized and principled. The child acquires culturally regarded skills and values. The child has evolved from a baby with primitive drives to a reasonable human being with complex feelings like shame, guilt and disgust. During this stage, the child learns to adapt to reality and also begins the process of what Freud terms 'infantile amnesia': the repression of the child's earliest traumatic, overly sexual or evil memories.

Other thinkers
Freud's daughter, the psychoanalyst Anna Freud, saw possible consequences for the child when the solution of the Oedipal problem is delayed. She states that this will lead to a variety of problems in the latency period: the child will have problems with adjusting to belonging to a group, and will show lack of interest, school phobias and extreme homesickness (if sent away to school). However, if the Oedipal problem is resolved, the latency phase may bring the child new problems, like joining gangs, rebelling against authority and the beginnings of delinquency. On the contrary, Jacques Lacan emphasized the importance of Oedipal problem for individuals' development and states that unsuccessful resolution of it is the most likely cause for inability to come to terms with symbolic relations such as the law and expectations of society. In most extreme cases of failure—where there is no opposition for the child's access to his mother and vice versa—the result is perversion.

The developmental psychologist and psychoanalyst Erik Erikson developed a stage model for the evolution of the ego. The latency phase corresponds to his stage of competence, or 'industry and inferiority', age 5 to puberty. The child is eager to learn new skills. During this stage, the child compares their self-worth to others. Because the child can recognize major disparities in their abilities relative to other children, the child may develop a sense of inferiority to them.

Notes

References
 Baldwin, A.L. (1967). Theories of child development. United States of America: John Wiley & Sons, Inc.
 Carver, S.C., Scheier, M.J. (2004). Perspectives on Personality (5th edition). United States of America: Pearson Education, Inc.
 Erikson, E.H. (1972). Het kind en de samenleving (6e druk). Utrecht/Antwerpen: Het 	Spectrum.
 Etchegoyen, A. (1993). Latency – a reappraisal. International Journal of Psychoanalysis, 74, 347-357.
 Freud, A. (1965/1980). Het normale en het gestoorde kind (vertaling, 1e druk). Rotterdam: Kooyker Wetenschappelijke Uitgeverij (Oorspr.: Normality and pathology in childhood, 1965).
 Kriekemans, A. (1965). Geschiedenis van de kinderpsychologie tot en met Sigmund Freud, Anna Freud en Melanie Klein. Tielt: Uitgeverij Lannoo.
 Kuiper, P.C. (1972). Neurosenleer (6e druk). Deventer: Van Loghum Slaterus.
 Woodworth, R.S, & Sheehan M.R. (1967). Contemporary schools of psychology (6e druk). Great Britain: the Ronald Press Company.

External links

Freud's Psychosexual Stages.

A short feminist critique of Freud's stages.

Freudian psychology
Child sexuality

he:המודל הפסיכוסקסואלי#שלב החביון